Ruiru is a constituency in Kenya. It is one of twelve constituencies in Kiambu County. Within Ruiru Constituency, there are two sub-counties; Githurai and Ruiru.

Wards
Prior to the 2013 elections, the area was put under the Kiambu County administration new elective wards namely Biashara, Gitothua, Gatongora, Kahawa Sukari, Kahawa Wendani, Mwiki, Mwihoko, and Kiuu.

References 

Constituencies in Kiambu County